The Second Takumi-gumi is a Japanese yakuza gang affiliated with the powerful Yamaguchi-gumi syndicate.

The Kansai-based gang was founded in 1967 by Masaru Takumi, the longtime second-in-command (wakagashira) and financial oversteer of the Yamaguchi-gumi.

Takumi was kumicho of gang's 1000-members until his assassination in Kobe in 1997 by members of the Nakano-kai.  His successor, Tadashi Irie, is the current kumicho.

References

Organizations established in 1967
1967 establishments in Japan
Yakuza groups
Yamaguchi-gumi